The Chief Judge of Abia State is the title or office appointed to the head of the judiciary of the Abia State Government. The Chief Judge is appointed by the Governor of Abia State to preside over the state's High Court and also to oversee and supervise its unified court system. The incumbent Chief Judge is Justice Theresa Uzokwe, who was appointed into the position by Theodore Orji on 22 December 2014.

Appointment
The Chief Judge is appointed by the Governor on the recommendation of the National Judicial Council subject to confirmation of the appointment by the Abia State House of Assembly as required by Section 271 of the 1999 Constitution of Nigeria.

List of Chief Judges

Ijeoma Offonry
Nnenna Oti (Acting)
Shedrack Nwanosike (Acting)
Stella Nwakanma
Theresa Uzokwe

See also
Abia State Government
Attorney General of Abia State

References

Judiciary of Abia State
Chief Judges of Abia State